Lisa Weise (16 December 1880 as Louise Ottilie Georgine Anna Weise – 6 December 1951) was a German actress and singer.

Life and career 
Born in Weimar the daughter of the oboist and Grand Ducal chamber virtuoso Ernst Weise and his wife Ottilie, née Zimmermann, she began her stage career in 1903 in Metz and then played at various Berlin theatres between 1904 and 1910.

Parallel to her stage work, Weise regularly appeared in front of the camera as a leading actress from 1915 onwards, having already made an appearance in the sound picture The Count of Luxembourg in 1910.
She usually acted alongside Karl Beckersachs under the direction of Friedrich Zelnik.

Weise was married from 1907 to 1919 to factory owner Felix Stern, who was the screenwriter responsible for Carl Wilhelm's 1915 feature film Carl and Carla.

Weise died in Weimar at the age of 70.

Filmography 
 1910: Der Graf von Luxemburg
 1915: Carl und Carla
 1916: Fräulein Wildfang
 1917: Klein Doortje
 1917: Edelweiß
 1917: Ein Zirkusmädel
 1917: His Majesty the Hypochondriac
 1917: Das große Los
 1917: Gänseliesel
 1918: Der Liftjunge
 1918: Amalie – 45 Mark

Radio plays  
 1926: Kurt Kraatz, Georg Okonkowski: Polish Economy. Posse with song in 3 acts. Directed by Alfred Braun (Sendespiel (radio play adaptation) – , Sendespielbühne – Abteilung: Schauspiel)

References

External links 
 
 Lisa Weise on  Filmportal
 
 

German silent film actresses
20th-century German actresses
German film actresses
German stage actresses
Audiobook narrators
German women singers
1880 births
1951 deaths
Actors from Weimar